Matthias Tischer (born 9 November 1985) is a former German football goalkeeper who works as a coach for 1. FC Magdeburg.

Career 
He have been with 1. FC Magdeburg since he was 19 years old. Tischer decided to end his career on 11 May 2016, but will continue his work at Magdeburg as their scout and goalkeeper coach.

Honours 
1. FC Magdeburg
Winner
 Saxony-Anhalt Cup: 2013–14
 Regionalliga Nordost: 2014–15

References

External links 
 

1985 births
Living people
German footballers
1. FC Magdeburg players
3. Liga players

Association football goalkeepers
Sportspeople from Magdeburg